The 26th Young Artist Awards ceremony, presented by the Young Artist Association, honored excellence of young performers under the age of 21 in the fields of film and television for the year 2004, and took place on April 30, 2005, at the Sportsmen's Lodge in Studio City, Los Angeles, California.

Established in 1978 by long-standing Hollywood Foreign Press Association member, Maureen Dragone, the Young Artist Association was the first organization to establish an awards ceremony specifically set to recognize and award the contributions of performers under the age of 21 in the fields of film, television, theater and music.

Categories
★ Bold indicates the winner in each category.

Best Performance in a Feature Film

Best Performance in a Feature Film - Leading Young Actor
★ Jamie Bell - Undertow - MGM/UA
Liam Aiken - Lemony Snicket's A Series of Unfortunate Events - Paramount/DreamWorks
Rory Culkin - Mean Creek - Paramount Classics
Freddie Highmore - Finding Neverland - Miramax
Bobby Preston - Motocross Kids - Tag Ent.

Best Performance in a Feature Film - Leading Young Actress
★ Emmy Rossum - The Phantom of the Opera - Warner Bros.
Emily Browning - Lemony Snicket's A Series of Unfortunate Events - Paramount/DreamWorks
Dakota Fanning - Man on Fire - 20th Century Fox
Carly Schroeder - Mean Creek - Paramount Classics
Alexa Vega - Sleepover - MGM

Best Performance in a Feature Film - Supporting Young Actor
★ Devon Alan - Undertow - MGM/UA
Cameron Bright - Birth - New Line Cinema
Hunter Gomez - National Treasure - Disney
Malcolm David Kelley - You Got Served - Sony Pictures
C. J. Sanders - Ray - Universal

Best Performance in a Feature Film - Supporting Young Actress
★ Kallie Flynn Childress - Sleepover - MGM
Shelbie Bruce - Spanglish - Columbia
Hannah Pilkes - The Woodsman - Newmarket Films
Sarah Steele - Spanglish - Columbia
Kristen Stewart - Undertow - MGM/UA

Best Performance in a Feature Film - Young Actor Age Ten or Younger
★ Luke Spill - Finding Neverland - Miramax
Ian Hyland - Spanglish - Columbia

Best Performance in a Feature Film - Young Actress Age Ten or Younger
★ Raquel Castro - Jersey Girl - Miramax
Kara and Shelby Hoffman - Lemony Snicket's A Series of Unfortunate Events - Paramount/DreamWorks

Best Performance in a Feature Film - Young Ensemble Cast
★ Finding Neverland - MiramaxFreddie Highmore, Joe Prospero, Nick Roud and Luke SpillMotocross Kids - Tag Entertainment
Josh Hutcherson, Bobby Preston, Alexa Nikolas and Wayne Dalglish
Sleepover - MGM
Sara Paxton, Mika Boorem, Sean Faris, Scout Taylor-Compton, Kallie Flynn Childress, Brie Larson, Evan Peters, Hunter Parrish, Douglas Smith, Katija Pevec, Eileen April Boylan and Ryan Slattery

Best Performance in an International Feature Film
Best Performance in an International Feature Film - Leading Young Performer
★ Yannick van de Velde - In Oranje (Netherlands)Katie Boland - Some Things That Stay (Canada)
Marc Donato - The Blue Butterfly (Canada)
Jean-Baptiste Maunier - Les Choristes (France)
Andrea Rossi - Le Chavi di Casa (Italy)
Yūya Yagira - Nobody Knows (Japan)

Best Performance in a Short Film
Best Performance in a Short Film
★ Madison Ford - Swan Dive - Voyager FilmsWill Bell - 17 Inch Cobras - Independent
Jillian Clare - Chasing Daylight - AFI
Jason Dolley - Chasing Daylight - AFI
Megan McKinnon - Samantha's Art - Independent
Hailey Anne Nelson - 17 Inch Cobras - Independent

Best Performance in a TV Movie, Miniseries or Special
Best Performance in a TV Movie, Miniseries or Special - Leading Young Actor
★ Cody Arens - Plainsong - CBSDan Byrd - 'Salem's Lot - TNT
David Dorfman - A Wrinkle in Time - ABC
Dominic Scott Kay - Single Santa Seeks Mrs. Claus - Hallmark
Anton Yelchin - Jack - Showtime

Best Performance in a TV Movie, Miniseries or Special - Leading Young Actress
★ Danielle Panabaker - Searching for David's Heart - ABC FamilyApril Mullen - Cavedweller - Showtime
Keke Palmer - The Wool Cap - Hallmark
Hayden Panettiere - Tiger Cruise - Disney Channel
AnnaSophia Robb - Samantha: An American Girl Holiday - WB
Shailene Woodley - A Place Called Home - Hallmark

Best Performance in a TV Movie, Miniseries or Special - Supporting Young Actor
★ Joseph Marrese - Lives of the Saints - CTVAlexander Conti - When Angels Come to Town - CBS
Zac Efron - Miracle Run - Lifetime
Brock Everitt-Elwick - The Lost Prince - PBS
Mick Hazen - Plainsong - CBS
Daniel Williams - The Lost Prince - PBS

Best Performance in a TV Movie, Miniseries or Special - Supporting Young Actress
★ Olivia Ballantyne - Samantha: An American Girl Holiday WBGenevieve Buechner - Family Sins - CTV
Bianca Collins - Tiger Cruise - Disney Channel
Dani Goldman - The Kids Who Saved Summer - Showtime
Miriam McDonald - She's Too Young - Lifetime

Best Performance in a TV Series
Best Performance in a TV Series (Comedy or Drama) - Leading Young Actor
★ (tie) Jack DeSena - All That - Nickelodeon★ (tie) Logan Lerman - Jack & Bobby - WBTyler Hoechlin - 7th Heaven - WB
Jamie Johnston - Wild Card - Lifetime
Malcolm David Kelley - Lost - ABC
Jesse McCartney - Summerland - WB
Romeo Miller - Romeo! - Nickelodeon
Adamo Ruggiero - Degrassi: The Next Generation - CTV

Best Performance in a TV Series (Comedy or Drama) - Leading Young Actress
★ Kay Panabaker - Summerland - WBAndrea Bowen - Desperate Housewives - ABC
Alyson Michalka - Phil of the Future - Disney Channel
Sara Paxton - Darcy's Wild Life - Discovery Kids
Scarlett Pomers - Reba - WB
Emma Roberts - Unfabulous - Nickelodeon

Best Performance in a TV Series (Comedy or Drama) - Supporting Young Actor
★ Jason Dolley - Complete Savages - ABCNoel Callahan - Romeo! - Nickelodeon
Oliver Davis - Rodney - ABC
Evan Ellingson - Complete Savages - ABC
Aubrey Graham - Degrassi: The Next Generation - CTV
Cody Kasch - Desperate Housewives - ABC
J. Dhylan Meyer - Everwood - WB

Best Performance in a TV Series (Comedy or Drama) - Supporting Young Actress
★ (tie) Christina Schmidt - Degrassi: The Next Generation - CTV★ (tie) Alia Shawkat - Arrested Development - FOXDanielle Bouffard - Doc - PAX
Vivien Cardone - Everwood - WB
Megan Fox - Hope & Faith - ABC
Sarah Ramos - American Dreams - NBC

Best Performance in a TV Series (Comedy or Drama) - Young Actor Age Ten or Younger
★ Zane Huett - Desperate Housewives - ABCEthan Dampf - American Dreams - NBC
Noah Gray-Cabey - My Wife and Kids - ABC
Mitch Holleman - Reba - WB
Matthew Josten - Rodney - ABC
Frankie Ryan Manriquez - Life with Bonnie - ABC

Best Performance in a TV Series (Comedy or Drama) - Young Actress Age Ten or Younger
★ Darcy Rose Byrnes - The Young and the Restless - CBSTaylor Atelian - According to Jim - ABC
Billi Bruno - According to Jim - ABC
Conchita Campbell - The 4400 - USA
Dee Dee Davis - The Bernie Mac Show - FOX
Jodelle Ferland - Kingdom Hospital - ABC
Kali Majors - ER - NBC

Best Performance in a TV Series (Comedy or Drama) - Guest Starring Young Actor
★ Christopher Malpede - That's So Raven - Disney ChannelLoren Berman - Without a Trace - CBS
Alex Black - CSI: Miami - CBS
Cameron Bowen - Judging Amy - CBS
Cody Estes - ER - NBC
Carter Jenkins - Everwood - WB
Andrew Michaelson - Judging Amy - CBS
Cole Peterson - Oliver Beene - FOX

Best Performance in a TV Series (Comedy or Drama) - Guest Starring Young Actress
★ Alix Kermes - Kevin Hill - UPNDanielle Churchran - Crossing Jordan - NBC
Jennette McCurdy - Strong Medicine - Lifetime
Erica Mer - Medical Investigation - NBC
Katelin Petersen - Judging Amy - CBS
Cassie Steele - Doc - PAX
Tessa Vonn - Threat Matrix - ABC
Aria Wallace - Strong Medicine - Lifetime

Best Performance in a TV Series (Comedy or Drama) - Recurring Young Actor
★ Cameron Monaghan - Malcolm in the Middle - FOXSpencer Achtymichuk - The Dead Zone - USA
Oliver Davis - E.R. - NBC
J. B. Gaynor - The George Lopez Show ABC
Christopher Gerse - Days of Our Lives - NBC
Carter Jenkins - Unfabulous - Nickelodeon
Austin Majors - NYPD Blue - ABC
Rory Thost - Phil of the Future - Disney Channel

Best Performance in a TV Series (Comedy or Drama) - Recurring Young Actress
★ Jillian Clare - Days of Our Lives - NBCKay Panabaker - Phil of the Future - Disney Channel
Alex Rose Steele - Degrassi: The Next Generation - CTV
Scout Taylor-Compton - The Guardian - CBS
Keaton and Kylie Rae Tyndall - The Bold and the Beautiful - CBS
Brittney Wilson - Romeo! - Nickelodeon

Outstanding Young Ensemble Performers in a TV Series
★ That's So Raven - Disney ChannelOrlando Brown, Kyle Massey, Anneliese van der Pol, Raven-SymonéAll That - Nickelodeon
Chelsea Brummet, Ryan Coleman, Lisa Foiles, Christina Kirkman, Shane Lyons, Giovonnie Samuels, Jack DeSena, Jamie Lynn Spears, Kyle Sullivan
Degrassi: The Next Generation - CTV
Ryan Cooley, Jake Epstein, Stacey Farber, Aubrey Drake Graham, Miriam McDonald, Adamo Ruggiero, Christina Schmidt, Alex Rose Steele, Cassie Steele, Sarah Barrable Tishauer
Unfabulous - Nickelodeon
Jordan Calloway, Bianca Collins, Dustin Ingram, Carter Jenkins, Malese Jow, Emma Roberts, Brandon Mychal Smith, Chelsea Tavares

Best Performance in a Voice-Over Role
Best Performance in a Voice-Over Role - Young Artist
★ Tajja Isen - Atomic Betty - Cartoon NetworkPatrick Alan Dorn - Teacher's Pet - Disney
Spencer Fox - The Incredibles - Disney/Pixar
Taylor Masamitsu - Higglytown Heroes - Disney Channel
Matt Weinberg - The Lion King 1½ - Disney
Brittney Wilson - Polly and the Pockets - Mattel

Best Family Entertainment
Best Family Television Movie or Special
★ Miracle Run - LifetimePlainsong - Hallmark
Prodigy - WB
Samantha: An American Girl Holiday - WB
Searching for David's Heart - ABC Family
The Winning Season - TNT

Best Family Television Series (Drama)
★ Jack & Bobby - WB7th Heaven - WB
American Dreams - NBC
Summerland - WB

Best Family Television Series (Comedy)
★ Reba - WBAll That - Nickelodeon
Complete Savages - ABC
Darcy's Wild Life - NBC
Rodney - ABC
Still Standing - CBS

Best Short Film Starring Youth
★ Chasing Daylight - AFISamantha's Art - Independent
17 Inch Cobras - Independent
Swan Dive - Voyager Films

Best International Feature Film
★ In Oranje - NetherlandsThe Blue Butterfly - Canada
Les Choristes (The Chorus) - France
Le Chiavi Di Casa (The Keys to the House) - Italy
Yesterday - South Africa

Best Family Feature Film - Animation
★ The Incredibles - Disney/PixarHome on the Range - Disney
Shrek 2 - DreamWorks Skg
The SpongeBob SquarePants Movie - Nickelodeon

Best Family Feature Film - Comedy or Musical
★ Christmas with the Kranks - ColumbiaJersey Girl - Miramax
Lemony Snicket's A Series of Unfortunate Events - Paramount/DreamWorks
The Phantom of the Opera - Warner Bros.
Sleepover - MGM
Spanglish - Columbia

Best Family Feature Film - Drama
★ Finding Neverland - MiramaxCatch That Kid - 20th Century Fox
Friday Night Lights - Universal
Garden State - Fox Searchlight
In Good Company - Universal
National Treasure - Disney

Special awards
Outstanding Young Rock Musician
★ Antonio Pontarelli - Rock Violinist (California)Outstanding Young Entertainment Journalist
★ Angela Riccio - Journalist / Feature WriterOutstanding Young Performance in Theater
★ Darian Weiss - 'Young Patrick' in Auntie Mame

Outstanding Young Ensemble in a New Medium

Young Motion Performance Capture and Voice Artists
★ The Polar Express
Jimmy Bennett, Josh Hutcherson, Dante Pastula, Daryl Sabara, Dylan Cash, Connor Matheus, Isabella Peregrina, Evan Sabara, Ashly Holloway, Hayden McFarland, Jimmy 'Jax' Pinchak, Chantel Valdivieso

Jackie Coogan Award

Contribution to Youth Through Motion Pictures
★ The Polar Express - Warner Brothers Pictures

Michael Landon Award

Contribution to Youth Through Television
★ Raven-Symoné - That's So Raven - Disney Channel

References

External links 
Official site

Young Artist Awards ceremonies
2004 film awards
2004 television awards
2005 in California
2005 in American cinema
2005 in American television